General Higgins may refer to:

Edward Higgins (1864–1947), General of The Salvation Army
Edward Higgins (Confederate general) (1821–1875), Confederate States Army brigadier general
Gerald J. Higgins (1909–1996), U.S. Army major general
Jack Higgins (RAF officer) (1875–1948), British Army Royal Flying Corps general
Thomas Higgins (RAF officer) (1880–1953), British Army Royal Flying Corps general

See also
Attorney General Higgins (disambiguation)